.bible is a delegated top-level domain (TLD), approved by ICANN as a generic TLD (gTLD).

Usage
According to the ICANN application for this TLD, "The goal of the .BIBLE top-level domain is to establish itself as the recognized choice for registrants who want to market and promote themselves and their websites to, and reach, the Internet-using community, for ministry, business, personal or any other purpose, through a positive association with the Bible; and, as the recognized top level domain name for Internet consumers to know which people, businesses, information sources or other online resources associate themselves with the Bible."

Significance
Doug Birdsall, former president of the American Bible Society, described the domain as "the Bible's moment to move from Gutenberg to Google."

See also 

 .church

References

External links
 
 

Generic top-level domains
2016 introductions
Bible in popular culture